Pultenaea petiolaris, commonly known as woolly bush-pea, is a species of flowering plant in the family Fabaceae and is endemic to eastern Australia. It is a low-lying shrub with linear leaves, pea-like flowers and flattened fruit.

Description
Pultenaea petiolaris is a low-lying shrub with hairy stems. There is a groove along the upper surface of the leaves, the edges are rolled under and the lower surface is paler than the upper surface.

Taxonomy
Pultenaea petiolaris was first formally described in 1837 by George Bentham from an unpublished description by Allan Cunningham. Bentham's description was published in his book Commentationes de Leguminosarum Generibus. The specific epithet (petiolaris) means "having a petiole".

Distribution and habitat
This pultenaea grows in heath, woodland and forest from the North Kennedy district, inland to the Maranoa in Queensland, and south to Grafton in north-eastern New South Wales.

References

Fabales of Australia
Flora of New South Wales
Flora of Queensland
petiolaris
Plants described in 1837
Taxa named by George Bentham